Ahmadabad (also Romanized as Aḩmadābād) is a village in Sardasht Rural District, in the Central District of Lordegan County, Chaharmahal and Bakhtiari Province, Iran. At the 2006 census, its population was 154, in 26 families.

References 

Populated places in Lordegan County